Remo Staubli (born October 7, 1988) is an American-born Swiss retired footballer who played as a forward. He was part of FC Zürich's 2006–07 Swiss Championship-winning team. He had a trial with Manchester United in July 2005.

References

1988 births
Living people
Soccer players from New York (state)
Swiss men's footballers
Switzerland youth international footballers
American soccer players
American people of Swiss descent
Swiss Super League players
Swiss Challenge League players
FC Zürich players
FC Schaffhausen players
FC Lugano players
FC Aarau players
Association football forwards
FC Rapperswil-Jona players